Papyrus Oxyrhynchus 288 (P. Oxy. 288 or P. Oxy. II 288) is a fragment of a Taxation Account, in Greek. It was discovered in Oxyrhynchus. The manuscript was written on papyrus in the form of a sheet. It was written after 22 July 25. Currently it is housed in the British Library (Department of Manuscripts 798) in London.

Description 
The measurements of the fragment are 363 by 180 mm. The document is mutilated.

The document was written by Tryphon, son of Dionysius, a weaver of Oxyrhynchus. It contains a Taxation Account. The first four lines are written in a careful cursive, the rest in a larger and freer hand.

This papyrus was discovered by Grenfell and Hunt in 1897 in Oxyrhynchus. The text was published by Grenfell and Hunt in 1899.

See also 
 Oxyrhynchus Papyri

References 

288
1st-century manuscripts
British Library collections